HMAS Bunbury (FCPB 217), named for the city of Bunbury, Western Australia, was a  of the Royal Australian Navy (RAN).

Design and construction

Main propulsion machinery consisted of two MTU series 538 diesel engines, which supplied  to the two propeller shafts. Exhaust was not expelled through a funnel, like most ships, but through vents below the waterline. The ship's company consisted of 22 personnel. Each patrol boat was armed with a single Bofors 40mm gun as main armament, supplemented by two .50 cal Browning machineguns and an 81 mm mortar, although the mortar was removed from all ships sometime after 1988. The main weapon was originally to be two 30 mm guns on a twin-mount, but the reconditioned Bofors were selected to keep costs down; provision was made to install an updated weapon later in the class' service life, but this did not eventuate.

Bunbury was laid down by NQEA in Cairns, Queensland on 13 June 1983, launched on 3 November 1984, and commissioned into the RAN on 15 December 1984.

Fate
Bunbury was decommissioned on 11 February 2006. The patrol boat was broken up for scrap in Darwin during 2006 and 2007, at a cost of $450,000 to the Australian government.

Citations

References

 The chapter is available separately as Semaphore, Issue 17, 2005 in PDF and HTML formats.

External links
 RAN webpage for HMAS Bunbury

Fremantle-class patrol boats
Ships built in Queensland
1978 ships